National Innovations in Climate Resilient Agriculture (NICRA) was launched during February 2011 by Indian Council of Agricultural Research (ICAR) with the funding from Ministry of Agriculture, Government of India. The mega project has three major objectives of strategic research, technology demonstrations and capacity building. Assessment of the impact of climate change simultaneous with formulation of adaptive strategies is the prime approach under strategic research across all sectors of agriculture, dairying and fisheries. 

Evolving climate resilient agricultural technologies that would increase farm production and productivity vis-à-vis continuous management of natural and manmade resources constitute an integral part of sustaining agriculture in the era of climate change. The four modules of NICRA – natural resource management, improving soil health, crop production and livestock – is aimed making the farmers self-reliant.

Objectives
 To enhance the resilience of Indian agriculture covering crops, livestock and fisheries to climatic variability and climate change through development and application of improved production and risk management technologies.  
 To demonstrate site specific technology packages on farmers' fields for adapting to current climate risks.  
 To enhance the capacity of scientists and other stakeholders in climate resilient agricultural research and its application.

Output
 Selection of promising crop genotypes and livestock breeds with greater tolerance to climatic stress.
 Existing best bet practices for climate resilience demonstrated in 100 vulnerable districts.
 Infrastructure at key research institutes for climatic change research strengthened.
 Adequately trained scientific manpower to take up climate change research in the country and empowered farmers to cope with climate variability.

Components of the Scheme
The Scheme will be implemented for the remaining two years (2010–11 and 2011–12) of the XI Plan and likely to continue in the XII Plan with the following four components.  
 Strategic research on adaptation and mitigation.
 Technology demonstration to cope with current climate variability in 100 vulnerable districts.
 Capacity building
 Sponsored competitive research to fill critical gaps

Key Features
 Critical assessment of different crops/zones in the country for vulnerability to climatic stresses and extreme events, in particular, intra seasonal variability of rainfall
 Installation of the state-of-the-art equipment like flux towers for measurement of green house gases in large field areas to understand the impact of management practices and contribute data on emissions as national responsibility.
 Rapid and large scale screening of crop germplasm including wild relatives for drought and heat tolerance through phenomics platforms for quick identification of promising lines and early development and release of heat/drought tolerant varieties.
 Comprehensive field evaluation of new and emerging approaches of paddy cultivation like aerobic rice and SRI for their contribution to reduce the GHG emissions and water saving. 
 Special attention to livestock and fishery sectors including aquaculture which have not received enough attention in climate change research in the past. In particular, the documentation of adaptive traits in indigenous breeds is the most useful step.
 Thorough understanding of crop-pest/pathogen relationship and emergence of new biotypes due to climate change.
 Simultaneous up-scaling of the outputs both through KVKs and the National Mission on Sustainable Agriculture for wider adoption by the farmers
 Integrated simulation modeling for research, development and policy support

Strategic Research
Adaptation to climate variability and climate change requires long term strategic research in the area of Natural Resource Management, Crops, Pests and disease dynamics, Livestock, Fisheries & Energy Efficiency. Focused programmes are taken up on different commodities on adaptation and mitigation.
The strategic research is being carried out involving 21 Institutes of the Indian Council of Agricultural Research out of which seven are core institutes where state of the art research infrastructure and equipments will be installed for climate change research on irrigated crops, rainfed crops, horticulture, livestock, fisheries and energy efficiency. ICAR Research Complex-NEH at Shillong is addressing all issues related to North-East.

 

The seven Core institutes are

 Central Research Institute for Dryland Agriculture (CRIDA), Hyderabad
 Indian Agricultural Research Institute (IARI), New Delhi
 Indian Institute of Horticultural Research (IIHR), Bangalore
 National Dairy Research Institute (NDRI), Karnal
 Central Marine Fisheries Research Institute (CMFRI), Cochin
 Central Institute of Agricultural Engineering (CIAE), Bhopal
 ICAR-Research Complex for NEH Region, Barapani, Shillong 

 Indian Veterinary Research Institute (IVRI), Izatnagar
 Central Inland Fisheries Research Institute (CIFRI), Barrackpore
 Central Institute for Brackish Water Aquaculture (CIBA), Chennai
 National Institute for Abiotic Stress Management (NIASM),Baramati, Pune
 Central Rice Research Institute (CRRI), Cuttack
 Directorate of Rice Research (DRR), Hyderabad
 Indian Institute of Pulses Research (IIPR), Kanpur
 Indian Institute of Vegetable Research (IIVR), Varanasi
 ICAR Research Complex for Eastern Region, Ranchi
 National Institute of Plant Biotechnology, New Delhi
 National Centre for Integrated Pest Management (NCIPM), New Delhi
 National Research Centre for Agro Forestry (NRCAF), Jhansi
 Directorate of Water Management, Bhubhaneshwar
  Indian Institute of Farming System Research (PDFSR), Modipuram

Technology Demonstration
The technology demonstration component consists of the following partners:

 KVKs in eight zones -100 
 Co-operating centres of AICRP on Dryland Agriculture - 25
 Technology Transfer Divisions of Core Institutes – 7 
Under this component, an integrated package of proven technologies would be demonstrated in one village panchayat in each district for adaptation and mitigation of the crop and livestock production systems to climate variability based on the available technologies. 

The process of finalizing demonstration consists of the following steps:
 Analysis of climatic constraints of village based on long term data
 Assessment of the natural resources status of the village
 Identification of major production systems
 Studying of existing institutional structures and identify gaps Focus group discussion with the community to finalize the interventions
The interventions cover the following four modules:

Module I : Natural resources

This module consists of interventions related to in-situ moisture conservation, water harvesting and recycling for supplemental irrigation, improved drainage in flood prone areas, conservation tillage where appropriate, artificial ground water recharge and water saving irrigation methods.

Module II : Crop Production

This module consists of introducing drought/temperature tolerant varieties, advancement of planting dates of rabi crops in areas with terminal heat stress, water saving paddy cultivation methods (SRI, aerobic, direct seeding), frost management in horticulture through fumigation, community nurseries for delayed monsoon, custom hiring centres for timely planting, location specific intercropping systems with high sustainable yield index.

Module III : Livestock and Fisheries

Use of community lands for fodder production during droughts/floods, improved fodder/feed storage methods, preventive vaccination, improved shelters for reducing heat stress in livestock, management of fish ponds/tanks during water scarcity and excess water, etc.

Module IV : Institutional Interventions

This module consist of institutional interventions either by strengthening the existing ones or initiating new ones relating to seed bank, fodder bank, commodity groups, custom hiring centre, collective marketing, introduction of weather index based insurance and climate literacy through a village level weather station.

The Process

The KVK team for each district carried out a detailed exercise on the needs of the village, the climatic vulnerability (drought/floods/heat wave/frost/cyclone) and the available technology options from the concerned Zonal Agricultural Research Stations of the SAU. After a careful study of the gaps, specific interventions from each of the modules were to be selected and an integrated package from all modules was be formulated. Majority farmers are to be covered with one or more of the interventions in order to demonstrate a discernible effect. As an outcome of this exercise location specific climate resilient practices and constraints in its adoption would be documented.

Zone wise profile of selected districts and its climatic vulnerabilities

See also
 Indian Council of Agricultural Research
 Indian missions
 Van Vigyan Kendra (VVK) Forest Science Centres

References

External links
 NICRA on the web

Indian missions
Indian Council of Agricultural Research
Agriculture in India
Climate of India